Theater of the Stars may refer to:
An attraction at  Disney's Hollywood Studios
Theater of the Stars: a novel of physics and memory, 2003 novel by N. M. Kelby